Freepsum is a village in the municipality of Krummhörn in the district of Aurich in East Frisia in North Germany. The village has 437 inhabitants (as at: 31 December 2006) and lies about ten kilometres northwest of the seaport of Emden.

Freepsum was an independent parish until the foundation of the municipality of Krummhörn as part of the Lower Saxony municipal reforms in 1972. Today the village is one of the 19 parishes in the Krummhörn, as the municipality is colloquially called.

Immediately southeast of the village is the Freepsum Sea or Freepsumer Meer, a former inland lake that has since been drained. The lowest point of the resulting hollow was for a long time the lowest point in Germany, at 2.5 metres below sea level, but has since been superseded in that respect by a point in Neuendorf-Sachsenbande which has officially been measured at 3.5 metres below Normalnull.

Church 
The Freepsum Church was built in the 13th century.

Krummhörn